Marcelo Fedrizzi Demoliner (born 18 January 1989) is a Brazilian professional tennis player. A doubles specialist, he won his first title at the ATP 250 Antalya Open with Santiago González in June 2018, after having reached six finals at that level. He was runner-up at the ATP 500 Vienna in 2018 and Saint Petersburg in 2020. 

Alongside Maria José Martinez Sanchez, he was a mixed doubles semifinalist in 2017 Wimbledon Championships and 2018 Australian Open. He reached a career-high ranking of world No. 34 in doubles in November 2017.

Career

2006: Turned Professional 
Demoliner turned professional in 2006, playing smaller tournaments (Futures). In 2007, he played his 1st Challenger. At this time, he was considered one of the promises of the sport in Brazil.

2009-2012: First singles Challenger title, new partnership with Souza
In 2009, he entered the top 300 and won his first Challenger title in Blumenau. In 2011, again achieved good results in Blumenau Challenger, being runner-up. These were the two best results in singles thus far.

In doubles, Demoliner won two Challenger titles in 2009. However, only in 2012 formed a fixed partnership with João Souza, aiming to become an ATP-level doubles player. The partnership began in September and quickly obtained good results: five Challenger finals in a row, with two runners-up (Cali and Quito) and three titles (Campinas, Rio de Janeiro, and Porto Alegre). With this, Demoliner was approaching the top 100 at doubles.

2013-2016: Top 100 & Major debut, Wimbledon & US Open third rounds 
In February 2013, Demoliner first entered the doubles top 100. In the first half of 2013, he won four Challengers in doubles. In June 2013, he participated for the first time in a Grand Slam at the 2013 Wimbledon Championships with compatriot André Sá, losing in the first round to the Bryan brothers, the No. 1 duo in the world. He also reached the semifinals of the ATP 250 Newport in July.

In 2014 he had, as campaign highlights, the semifinals of the ATP 250 Zagreb and two Challenger titles in Quito and Cordoba.

In 2015, he won two more Challengers (Cali and Ilkley), reached the third round of Wimbledon, the second round of the US Open, and began to participate in more ATP tournaments.

In 2016, Demoliner’s best results were two runner-ups at the ATP 250 in Quito and Bastad, the semifinal of the ATP 500 Rio de Janeiro, and the third round at the US Open.

2017: Mixed doubles semifinal at Wimbledon, four finals
In 2017, he reached the 3rd round of the Australian Open and got three more runner-ups on the ATP 250 level in São Paulo, Lyon and Chengdu alongside Marcus Daniell. He was also runner-up at the ATP 500 in Vienna alongside Sam Querrey for the very first time at this level.

2018: First ATP title, second mixed doubles semifinal
In 2018, he won his first ATP 250 title in Antalya with Santiago González. He also was runner-up at ATP 250 Antwerp, and won a Challenger title in Barcelona.

2019: 100th career win, partnership with Middlekoop
In 2019, he won a Challenger title in Canberra alongside Frenchman Hugo Nys, two ATP 250 runner-ups in Munich and Zhuhai, alongside Indian Divij Sharan and Dutch Matwé Middelkoop respectively and won one ATP 250 title in Moscow alongside Middelkoop, completing his career win number 100. At the end of the Russian event, Demoliner ended his season aiming for rest and training for 2020 Australian Open alongside Middelkoop in January.

2020: One title, one final
In 2020, he reached two finals alongside Middlekoop. In the South American swing (clay), they won the Córdoba Open defeating Argentines Leonardo Mayer and Andrés Molteni in the final. In October, they were runner-ups St. Petersburg Open losing to the number 2 seeded pair, Austrian Jürgen Melzer and Frenchman Édouard Roger-Vasselin.

2021: Fourth ATP title, Hiatus due to surgery
In 2021, Demoliner and his current partner Santiago González took the first dose of a COVID-19 vaccine at the 2021 Serbia Open. In grass season, he won his fourth ATP 250 title at Stuttgart Open defeating Uruguayan Ariel Behar and Gonzalo Escobar from Ecuador. On 31 October, Demoliner announced the end of his season due to a knee injury and soon afterward had a successful surgery.

2022: First Grand Slam quarterfinal with Sousa
In 2022, Demoliner was expected to return at 2022 Chile Open after four months without playing but withdrew before the tournament. Nine months after his surgery, Demoliner returned at an ATP Challenger Tour event Brawo Open in Germany. Demoliner partnering Jan-Lennard Struff won the title in the same event.

Using a protected ranking at the US Open, he reached a Grand Slam  quarterfinal for the first time in his career with his partner Joao Sousa, having never passed the third round at a Major.

ATP career finals

Doubles: 14 (4 titles, 10 runner-ups)

Challenger and Futures finals

Singles: 15 (7–8)

Doubles: 61 (35–26)

Doubles performance timeline

Current through the end of 2022 US Open.

References

External links

 
 

1989 births
Living people
Brazilian male tennis players
People from Caxias do Sul
Sportspeople from Porto Alegre
Tennis players at the 2020 Summer Olympics
Olympic tennis players of Brazil